René Mornex (12 August 1927 – 11 April 2022) was a French doctor and academic. He is honorary dean of the Faculty of Medicine of University of Lyon and pioneer of endocrinology, more particularly of neuroendocrinology.

References

1927 births
2022 deaths
20th-century French physicians
French academics
University of Lyon alumni
Academic staff of the University of Lyon
Physicians from Lyon